The Illinois class was a group of three pre-dreadnought battleships of the United States Navy commissioned at the beginning of the 20th century. They were transitional ships; they incorporated advances over preceding designs, including the first modern gun turrets for the main battery, and new rapid-firing secondary guns, but they were also the last American battleships to feature dated technologies like fire-tube boilers and Harvey armor. They were armed with a main battery of four  guns in two twin turrets, supported by a secondary battery of fourteen  guns.

The three ships served in a variety of roles and locations throughout their career. Illinois served with the North Atlantic Squadron and the European Squadron early in her career, while Wisconsin served as the flagship of the Pacific Fleet and then in the Asiatic Fleet. Illinois and Alabama started the cruise of the Great White Fleet in December 1907 from the east coast of the United States, though by the time they had rounded South America and stopped in California, Alabama was forced to leave the fleet due to machinery problems. Wisconsin joined the fleet there and continued on with it to the conclusion of its tour in February 1909. All three ships were modernized in 1909 and served in the Atlantic Fleet for a short time.

By 1912, all three ships had been reduced to the reserve fleet and were primarily employed as training ships. They continued in this role during World War I, training men to operate the machinery of warships and transports for the war effort. They were all decommissioned by 1920. Illinois was loaned to the New York Naval Militia and was converted into a floating arsenal. Renamed Prairie State in 1941, she was eventually sold for scrapping in 1956. Wisconsin was broken up for scrap in 1922, while Alabama was expended as a target ship in September 1921 in bombing tests with the US Army Air Service.

Design
Design work on what became the Illinois class began on 25 March 1896, when Rear Admiral J. G. Walker convened a board to consider future battleship designs. At the time, the only modern battleship in service was the low-freeboard ; the high-freeboard battleship  and the low-freeboard  were under construction. As the Navy had little experience with modern battleships, the question settled on whether to repeat one of the low-freeboard designs, which were suitable for coast defense, to build another Iowa, or to request a new design altogether. The Walker Board determined that another coastal battleship design would be imprudent, since the United States had long coastlines and therefore the new ships would need to have better seakeeping qualities than the Indiana or Kearsarge designs.

The board was unwilling to make that concession, and so a new design would be required. In addition, the board had determined that the  secondary gun was unnecessary, since though it could penetrate the thinner casemate armor on enemy battleships, it could not deliver a high-explosive shell through the armor. Instead, the board decided that a new  rapid-firing gun would be superior. It would also simplify the ammunition supply, since there would be only one secondary caliber.

The board determined that the armor layout of the Kearsarge design was sufficient and adopted it without change for the new ships. They discarded the superposed turrets of the Kearsarges, though, by mounting most of the secondary guns in a battery amidships. A new turret design for the main battery was adopted; instead of the old, round -style turrets of earlier ships, the Illinois' design featured a balanced turret with sloped armor on the face. Since it was balanced, it would prevent the ship from listing when the battery was trained to either broadside, as was the case with the Indianas. The US Congress authorized three new battleships on 10 June 1896; the Bureau of Construction and Repair issued its requests for tenders from the various American shipbuilding companies twelve days later. Contracts for the new ships, to be named Illinois, Alabama, and Wisconsin, were awarded on 28 August.

General characteristics and machinery

As built, they were fitted with heavy military masts, but these were replaced by cage masts in 1909. They had a crew of 40 officers and 496 enlisted men. The crew increased to 690–713 later in her career.

Steam was provided by eight coal-fired fire-tube boilers that were trunked into a pair of funnels that were arranged side-by-side. They were the last ships of the US Navy to use fire-tube boilers; subsequent designs changed to more efficient and lighter water-tube boilers.

Armament
The ships were armed with a main battery of four /35 caliber guns guns in two twin gun turrets on the centerline, one forward and aft. The gun was slow-firing, requiring 320 seconds between shots. The guns were mounted in Mark IV turrets, which had a range of elevation of 15 degrees to -5 degrees. The turrets required the guns to return to 2 degrees for loading. Ammunition storage was 60 shells per gun.

The secondary battery consisted of fourteen /40 caliber Mark IV guns, which were placed in casemates in the hull. For close-range defense against torpedo boats, they carried sixteen  6-pounder guns mounted in casemates along the side of the hull and six  1-pounder guns. These guns fired  and  shells, respectively. As was standard for capital ships of the period, the Illinois class carried four  torpedo tubes in above-water, hull mounted torpedo launchers.

Armor
All three ships were protected with Harvey armor; they were the last ships of the US Navy to rely entirely on Harvey steel. It gradually reduced to  toward the bow.

Ships in class

Service history

From their commissioning, Alabama and Illinois served with the North Atlantic Squadron. Both ships made visits to Europe during their early careers, and Illinois served as the flagship of the European Squadron for a short time in 1902. She accidentally ran aground outside Oslo, Norway, in 1902 and returned to the North Atlantic Squadron in January 1903. Wisconsin, having been built on the west coast of the United States, instead served in the Pacific Fleet as its flagship. In 1903, she was transferred to the Asiatic Fleet, and remained there until late 1906 when she returned to California.

Illinois and Alabama steamed with the Great White Fleet on its world cruise that started in December 1907. Wisconsin joined the fleet after it had rounded South America in July 1908; Alabama had to leave the fleet owing to engine damage that required repairs. Alabama was detached along with the battleship ; the two ships continued the journey independently and on a greatly shortened itinerary. The rest of the ships then crossed the Pacific and stopped in Australia, the Philippines, and Japan before continuing on through the Indian Ocean. They transited the Suez Canal and toured the Mediterranean before crossing the Atlantic, arriving bank in Hampton Roads on 22 February 1909 for a naval review with President Theodore Roosevelt.

The three ships were modernized after their return in 1909; from 1912, they were placed in reserve commission and employed as training ships for midshipmen from the US Naval Academy and naval militia units. They continued in this role through World War I, which the United States entered on 6 April 1917. The ships trained engine room personnel, armed guards for merchant ships, and other specialties. Following the German surrender in November 1918, most of the battleships of the Atlantic Fleet were used as transports to ferry American soldiers back from France. The Illinois-class ships were not so employed, however, owing to their short range and small size, which would not permit sufficient additional accommodations.

The Illinois-class ships served with the fleet only briefly after the war, still as training ships. By 1920, they had all been decommissioned. Wisconsin was sold for scrapping in January 1922 and broken up for scrap. Illinois was instead converted into a floating armory for the New York Naval Militia; renamed Prairie State in 1941, she served in this role until 1956, when she too was sold for scrap. Alabama met a more spectacular end as a target ship for bombing experiments conducted with the US Army Air Service in September 1921. She was hit with several bombs, including white phosphorus weapons and  armor-piercing bombs, before eventually foundering.

Footnotes

Notes

Citations

References

Further reading
 
 

Battleship classes
Illinois class battleship
Illinois class battleship